Evaldas Kairys (born October 11, 1990) is a Lithuanian professional basketball player for Rytas Vilnius of the Lithuanian Basketball League. He plays in the center position.

Professional career 
Kairys been a part of Lietuvos rytas Vilnius youth system from 2006 to 2011 when the Perlas Vilnius was dissolved. He then joined Pieno žvaigždės Pasvalys for four straight seasons. During his fourth season in Pasvalys, Kairys averaged 10.9 points, 5.9 rebounds in the Lithuanian Basketball League. On July 28, 2015 he signed with Muratbey Uşak Sportif of the premier Turkish Basketball League.

Kairys spent the 2018-19 and 2019-20 seasons with Rytas Vilnius of the Lithuanian Basketball League. He averaged 7.5 points and 3.9 rebounds per game in 2019-20. On August 6, 2020, Kairys signed with Afyon Belediye of the Turkish Basketbol Süper Ligi.

On February 25, 2022, Kairys signed with Rytas Vilnius.

International career 
Kairys represented the Lithuanian youth squads twice. He won silver medal with the U-18 National Team in 2008 FIBA Europe Under-18 Championship.

References 

Living people
1990 births
Afyonkarahisar Belediyespor players
BC Rytas players
BC Pieno žvaigždės players
Büyükçekmece Basketbol players
Centers (basketball)
Lithuanian men's basketball players
People from Klaipėda County
Uşak Sportif players